Lake Suttonfield (or Suttonfield Lake) is a reservoir about  southeast of Glen Ellen in the Sonoma Valley of Sonoma County, California, United States.  It is situated between the Sonoma Valley Regional Park and the Sonoma Developmental Center. Despite its small size, it is a well-known center for amphibians and other wildlife.

See also
List of dams and reservoirs in California
List of lakes in California
List of lakes in the San Francisco Bay Area

References

Reservoirs in Sonoma County, California
Sonoma Valley
Reservoirs in California
Reservoirs in Northern California